The Walloon language has employed various alphabets over its history, most notably the Feller system and Unified Walloon ( or ). The Feller system was developed to transcribe Walloon dialects by Jules Feller and was first published in 1900. It is a phonemic orthography, where each letter is associated with a sound in a consistent manner. The same word can be spelled differently depending on dialect, so the word "fish" would be spelled <> by a speaker who pronounces the word as [pɛʃɔ̃] (with an 'sh' sound), but would be spelled <> by a speaker who pronounces the word as [pɛhɔ̃] (with an 'h' sound). In Unified Walloon, however, the same word "fish" is always spelled <>, regardless of the speakers pronunciation. The Unified Walloon alphabet, developed through the 1980s and 90s, attempts to unify spellings across dialects, and revives some older digraphs (such as <xh>) which were abandoned by Feller in favor of spellings which resembled standard French.

Diacritics
Diacritics used in this language are the acute accent (´), grave accent (`), circumflex (ˆ), ring (°), and cedilla (¸). In some dialects, the umlaut (¨) is used. These accents have no effect on the alphabetic order of these letters.

{| class="wikitable"
! Grapheme
! Pronunciation
|- align=center
| à
| 
|- align=center
| â
| 
|- align=center
| å
|- align=center
| ç
| 
|- align=center
| é
| 
|- align=center
| è
| 
|- align=center
| ê
| 
|- align=center
| e̊/ë
| 
|- align=center
| ì
| 
|- align=center
| î
| 
|- align=center
| ô
|- align=center
| ö
| 
|- align=center
| ù
| 
|- align=center
| û
| 
|}

Digraphs
aî is only used in the Namur dialect. 
{| class="wikitable"
! Digraph
! Pronunciation
|- align=center
| ae
|/
|- align=center
| ai
| /
|- align=center
| aî
| 
|- align=center
| an
| /
|- align=center
| ån
| ?
|- align=center
| ch
|
|- align=center
| dj
|
|- align=center
| ea
|//
|- align=center
| en
| /
|- align=center
| én
| ///
|- align=center
| eu
| /
|- align=center
| ey
| ///
|- align=center
| gn/ny
| 
|- align=center
| in
| 
|- align=center
| î-n
| 
|- align=center
| jh
| , 
|- align=center
| oe
|- align=center
| oi
| , 
|- align=center
| on
| 
|- align=center
| ou
| 
|- align=center
| oû
| 
|- align=center
| ss
| 
|- align=center
| sch
|- align=center
| sh
| , 
|- align=center
| tch
| , 
|- align=center
| un
| 
|- align=center
| xh
| , 
|}

References

Latin alphabets

wa:Walon